"The One with Joey's Big Break" is the twenty-second episode of Friends fifth season. It first aired on the NBC network in the United States on May 13, 1999.

Plot
When Rachel is complaining about her eyes, Monica tells her to see her eye doctor, but Rachel refuses due to an unnatural fear of having anything near her or anyone else's eyes. Rachel eventually visits the eye doctor after much persuasion by Monica. The doctor tells her that she has a minor infection in her left eye and gives her eye drops for it. Monica takes extreme measures to give Rachel her eyedrops, to no avail. Eventually, Monica and the others manage to hold her down and give her the eyedrops.

Joey is told by his agent that he is to play the lead role in an upcoming movie called Shutter Speed, which is being filmed in Las Vegas. After hearing the news, Chandler decides to go with Joey. While the two are on the George Washington Bridge on their way to Vegas, Joey reveals to Chandler that rather than getting a fixed salary, he would instead be getting a part of the movie's profit. This causes Chandler to inadvertently reveal that he does not think that this movie would be Joey's big break, causing Joey to kick Chandler out of the car.

In Vegas, Joey arrives at the film site where the director reveals that production is being postponed due to a lack of funds and tells Joey to stand by until filming can resume. Joey gets a job at Caesars Palace and hides it from his friends.

Meanwhile, Phoebe finds herself upset with Ross, but cannot remember why. Ross posits several reasons why Phoebe might be unhappy with him, but is unable find the right reason. He soon plays Phoebe's game with her in an effort to find out, and discovers that Phoebe believes that he called her boring. Ross cannot remember ever saying that she was boring, and Phoebe then realizes that it was a dream.

Reception
In the original broadcast, the episode was viewed by 21.3 million viewers.

Sam Ashurst from Digital Spy ranked the episode #106 on their ranking of the 236 Friends episodes.

Telegraph & Argus placed the episode at the same spot on their ranking of all 236 Friends episodes, and wrote that the best line in the episode was: (Phoebe apologises to Ross for an earlier insult) "I am sorry about the fat ass thing. You actually have a very sweet little heinie".

References

1999 American television episodes
Friends (season 5) episodes